Höheinöd is a municipality in the Südwestpfalz district of Rhineland-Palatinate, Germany. It belongs to the Waldfischbach-Burgalben municipal association.

References

Municipalities in Rhineland-Palatinate
Südwestpfalz